= 1981 Egyptian protection of national unity referendum =

A referendum on "the protection of national unity" was held in Egypt on 10 September 1981. It was approved by 99.5% of voters.

== Results ==
Choice	Votes	%
For	10,965,993	99.45
Against	60,273	0.55
Invalid/blank votes	33,561	–
Total	11,059,827	100
Registered voters/turnout	12,028,462	91.95
Source: Direct Democracy
